Memetics is a study of information and culture. While memetics originated as an analogy with Darwinian evolution, digital communication, media, and sociology scholars have also adopted the term "memetics" to describe an established empirical study and theory described as Internet Memetics. Proponents of memetics, as evolutionary culture, describe it as an approach of cultural information transfer. Those arguing for the Darwinian theoretical account tend to begin from theoretical arguments of existing evolutionary models. Those arguing for Internet Memetics, by contrast, tend to avoid reduction to Darwinian evolutionary accounts. Instead some of these suggest distinct evolutionary approaches. Memetics describes how ideas or cultural information can propagate, but doesn't necessarily imply a meme's concept is factual.

Critics contend the theory is "untested, unsupported or incorrect". It has failed to become a mainstream approach to cultural evolution as the research community has favored models that exclude the concept of a cultural replicator (called "meme"), opting mostly for gene-culture co-evolution or dual inheritance theory instead. Lesser critical arguments suggest memetics is still valid, but analytically holds a smaller academic space in cultural evolutionary theory. Alternatively, Internet Memetics has yet to provide a tested theory of evolution, having sparse empirical studies. As such, it also struggles to be tested or adopted as an agreeable theory of evolution in a digital context.

The term meme was coined in Richard Dawkins' 1976 book The Selfish Gene, but Dawkins later distanced himself from the resulting field of study. Analogous to a gene, the meme was conceived as a "unit of culture" (an idea, belief, pattern of behavior, etc.) which is "hosted" in the minds of one or more individuals, and which can reproduce itself in the sense of jumping from the mind of one person to the mind of another. Thus what would otherwise be regarded as one individual influencing another to adopt a belief is seen as an idea-replicator reproducing itself in a new host. As with genetics, particularly under a Dawkinsian interpretation, a meme's success may be due to its contribution to the effectiveness of its host. However, contemporary to Dawkins, reduction of a meme to an immaterial idea was contested during memetics' early theoretical developments. Daniel Dennett went as far as to say "a meme's existence depends on a physical embodiment,"  rather than the other way around. Nevertheless, contemporary memetics tends to refer to these early memetic arguments as reducible to "mentalism".

History
In his book The Selfish Gene (1976), the evolutionary biologist Richard Dawkins used the term meme to describe a unit of human cultural transmission analogous to the gene, arguing that replication also happens in culture, albeit in a different sense. While cultural evolution itself is a much older topic, with a history that dates back at least as far as Darwin's era, Dawkins (1976) proposed that the meme is a unit of culture residing in the brain and is the mutating replicator in human cultural evolution. After Dawkins, many discussed this unit of culture as evolutionary "information" which replicates with metaphysically analogous rules to Darwinian selection. A replicator is a pattern that can influence its surroundings – that is, it has causal agency – and can propagate. This proposal resulted in debate among anthropologists, sociologists, biologists, and scientists of other disciplines. Dawkins himself did not provide a sufficient explanation of how the replication of units of information in the brain controls human behaviour and ultimately culture, and the principal topic of the book was genetics. Dawkins apparently did not intend to present a comprehensive theory of memetics in The Selfish Gene, but rather coined the term meme in a speculative spirit. Accordingly, different researchers came to define the term "unit of information" in different ways.

The evolutionary model of cultural information transfer is based on the concept that units of information, or "memes", have an independent existence, are self-replicating, and are subject to selective evolution through environmental forces. Starting from a proposition put forward in the writings of Richard Dawkins, this model has formed the basis of a new area of study, one that looks at the self-replicating units of culture. It has been proposed that just as memes are analogous to genes, memetics is analogous to genetics.

The modern memetics movement dates from the mid-1980s. A January 1983 "Metamagical Themas" column by Douglas Hofstadter, in Scientific American, was influential – as was his 1985 book of the same name. "Memeticist" was coined as analogous to "geneticist" – originally in The Selfish Gene. Later Arel Lucas suggested that the discipline that studies memes and their connections to human and other carriers of them be known as "memetics" by analogy with "genetics". Dawkins' The Selfish Gene has been a factor in attracting the attention of people of disparate intellectual backgrounds. Another stimulus was the publication in 1991 of Consciousness Explained by Tufts University philosopher Daniel Dennett, which incorporated the meme concept into a theory of the mind. In his 1991 essay "Viruses of the Mind", Richard Dawkins used memetics to explain the phenomenon of religious belief and the various characteristics of organised religions. By then, memetics had also become a theme appearing in fiction (e.g. Neal Stephenson's Snow Crash).

The idea of language as a virus had already been introduced by William S. Burroughs as early as 1962 in his fictional book The Ticket That Exploded, and continued in The Electronic Revolution, published in 1970 in The Job.

The foundation of memetics in its full modern incarnation was launched by Douglas Rushkoff's Media Virus: Hidden Agendas in Popular Culture in 1995, and was accelerated with the publication in 1996 of two more books by authors outside the academic mainstream: Virus of the Mind: The New Science of the Meme by former Microsoft executive turned motivational speaker and professional poker-player Richard Brodie, and Thought Contagion: How Belief Spreads Through Society by Aaron Lynch, a mathematician and philosopher who worked for many years as an engineer at Fermilab. Lynch claimed to have conceived his theory totally independently of any contact with academics in the cultural evolutionary sphere, and apparently was not aware of The Selfish Gene until his book was very close to publication.

Around the same time as the publication of the books by Lynch and Brodie the e-journal Journal of Memetics – Evolutionary Models of Information Transmission (published electronically from 1997 to 2005) first appeared. It was first hosted by the Centre for Policy Modelling at Manchester Metropolitan University. The e-journal soon became the central point for publication and debate within the nascent memeticist community. (There had been a short-lived paper-based memetics publication starting in 1990, the Journal of Ideas edited by Elan Moritz.) In 1999, Susan Blackmore, a psychologist at the University of the West of England, published The Meme Machine, which more fully worked out the ideas of Dennett, Lynch, and Brodie and attempted to compare and contrast them with various approaches from the cultural evolutionary mainstream, as well as providing novel, and controversial, memetics-based theories for the evolution of language and the human sense of individual selfhood.

Etymology 
The term meme derives from the Ancient Greek μιμητής (mimētḗs), meaning "imitator, pretender". The similar term mneme was used in 1904, by the German evolutionary biologist Richard Semon, best known for his development of the engram theory of memory, in his work Die mnemischen Empfindungen in ihren Beziehungen zu den Originalempfindungen, translated into English in 1921 as The Mneme. Until Daniel Schacter published Forgotten Ideas, Neglected Pioneers: Richard Semon and the Story of Memory in 2000, Semon's work had little influence, though it was quoted extensively in Erwin Schrödinger’s 1956 Tarner Lecture “Mind and Matter”. Richard Dawkins (1976) apparently coined the word meme independently of Semon, writing this:
"'Mimeme' comes from a suitable Greek root, but I want a monosyllable that sounds a bit like 'gene'. I hope my classicist friends will forgive me if I abbreviate mimeme to meme. If it is any consolation, it could alternatively be thought of as being related to 'memory', or to the French word même."David Hull (2001) pointed out Dawkins's oversight of Semon's work. Hull suggests this early work as an alternative origin to memetics by which Dawkins's memetic theory and classicist connection to the concept can be negotiated."Why not date the beginnings of memetics (or mnemetics) as 1904 or at the very least 1914? If [Semon's] two publications are taken as the beginnings of memetics, then the development of memetics [...] has been around for almost a hundred years without much in the way of conceptual or empirical advance!"Despite this, Semon's work remains mostly understood as distinct to memetic origins even with the overt similarities accounted for by Hull.

Internalists and externalists
The memetics movement split almost immediately into two. The first group were those who wanted to stick to Dawkins' definition of a meme as "a unit of cultural transmission". Gibron Burchett, another memeticist responsible for helping to research and co-coin the term memetic engineering, along with Leveious Rolando and Larry Lottman, has stated that a meme can be defined, more precisely, as "a unit of cultural information that can be copied, located in the brain". This thinking is more in line with Dawkins' second definition of the meme in his book The Extended Phenotype. The second group wants to redefine memes as observable cultural artifacts and behaviors. However, in contrast to those two positions, Blackmore does not reject either concept of external or internal memes.

These two schools became known as the "internalists" and the "externalists." Prominent internalists included both Lynch and Brodie; the most vocal externalists included Derek Gatherer, a geneticist from Liverpool John Moores University, and William Benzon, a writer on cultural evolution and music. The main rationale for externalism was that internal brain entities are not observable, and memetics cannot advance as a science, especially a quantitative science, unless it moves its emphasis onto the directly quantifiable aspects of culture. Internalists countered with various arguments: that brain states will eventually be directly observable with advanced technology, that most cultural anthropologists agree that culture is about beliefs and not artifacts, or that artifacts cannot be replicators in the same sense as mental entities (or DNA) are replicators. The debate became so heated that a 1998 Symposium on Memetics, organised as part of the 15th International Conference on Cybernetics, passed a motion calling for an end to definitional debates. McNamara demonstrated in 2011 that functional connectivity profiling using neuroimaging tools enables the observation of the processing of internal memes, "i-memes", in response to external "e-memes".
This was developed further in a paper "Memetics and Neural Models of Conspiracy Theories" by Duch, where a model of memes as a quasi-stable neural associative memory attractor network is proposed, and a formation of Memeplex leading to conspiracy theories illustrated with simulation of self-organizing network.

An advanced statement of the internalist school came in 2002 with the publication of The Electric Meme, by Robert Aunger, an anthropologist from the University of Cambridge. Aunger also organised a conference in Cambridge in 1999, at which prominent sociologists and anthropologists were able to give their assessment of the progress made in memetics to that date. This resulted in the publication of Darwinizing Culture: The Status of Memetics as a Science, edited by Aunger and with a foreword by Dennett, in 2001.

Decline
In 2005, the Journal of Memetics ceased publication and published a set of articles on the future of memetics. The website states that although "there was to be a relaunch... after several years nothing has happened". Susan Blackmore has left the University of the West of England to become a freelance science-writer and now concentrates more on the field of consciousness and cognitive science. Derek Gatherer moved to work as a computer programmer in the pharmaceutical industry, although he still occasionally publishes on memetics-related matters. Richard Brodie is now climbing the world professional poker rankings. Aaron Lynch disowned the memetics community and the words "meme" and "memetics" (without disowning the ideas in his book), adopting the self-description "thought contagionist". He died in 2005.

Susan Blackmore (2002) re-stated the definition of meme as: whatever is copied from one person to another person, whether habits, skills, songs, stories, or any other kind of information. Further she said that memes, like genes, are replicators in the sense as defined by Dawkins.
That is, they are information that is copied. Memes are copied by imitation, teaching and other methods. The copies are not perfect: memes are copied with variation; moreover, they compete for space in our memories and for the chance to be copied again. Only some of the variants can survive. The combination of these three elements (copies; variation; competition for survival) forms precisely the condition for Darwinian evolution, and so memes (and hence human cultures) evolve. Large groups of memes that are copied and passed on together are called co-adapted meme complexes, or memeplexes. In Blackmore's definition, the way that a meme replicates is through imitation. This requires brain capacity to generally imitate a model or selectively imitate the model. Since the process of social learning varies from one person to another, the imitation process cannot be said to be completely imitated. The sameness of an idea may be expressed with different memes supporting it. This is to say that the mutation rate in memetic evolution is extremely high, and mutations are even possible within each and every iteration of the imitation process. It becomes very interesting when we see that a social system composed of a complex network of microinteractions exists, but at the macro level an order emerges to create culture.

Many researchers of cultural evolution regard memetic theory of this time a failed paradigm superseded by dual inheritance theory. Others instead suggest it is not superseded but rather holds a small but distinct intellectual space in cultural evolutionary theory.

Possible Resurgence 

A new framework of Internet Memetics initially borrowed Blackmore's conceptual developments but is effectively a data-driven approach, focusing on digital artifacts. This was lead primarily by conceptual developments Colin Lankshear and Michele Knobel (2006)  and Limor Shifman and Mike Thelwall (2009). Shiman, in particular, followed Susan Blackmore in rejecting the internalist and externalist debate, however did not offer a clear connection to prior evolutionary frameworks. Later in 2014, she rejected the historical relevance of "information" to memetics. Instead of memes being a unit of cultural information, she argued information is exclusively delegated to be "the ways in which addressers position themselves in relation to [a meme instance's] text, its linguistic codes, the addressees, and other potential speakers." This is what she called stance, which is analytically distinguished from the content and form of her meme. As such, Shifman's developments can both can be seen as critical to Dawkins's meme, but also a somewhat distinct conceptualization of meme as a communicative system dependent on the internet and social media platforms. By introducing memetics as an internet study there has been the rise in empirical research owed to Internet research methods and extensive digital data. That is, memetics in this conceptualization has been notably testable with the application of social science methodologies. It has been popular enough that following Lankshear and Knobel's (2019) review of empirical trends, they warn those interested in memetics that theoretical development should not be ignored, concluding that, "[R]ight now would be a good time for anyone seriously interested in memes to revisit Dawkins’ work in light of how internet memes have evolved over the past three decades and reflect on what most merits careful and conscientious research attention."As Lankshear and Knobel show, the Internet Memetic reconceptualization is limited in addressing long-standing memetic theory concerns. It is not clear that existing Internet Memetic theory's departure from conceptual dichotomies between internalist and externalist debate are compatible with most earlier concerns of memetics. Internet Memetics might be understood as a study without an agreed upon theory, as present research tends to focus on empirical developments answering theories of other areas of cultural research. It exists more as a set of distributed studies than a methodology, theory, field, or discipline, with a few exceptions such as Shifman and those closely following her motivating framework.

Critics of memetics

Critics contend that some proponents' assertions are "untested, unsupported or incorrect." Most of the history of memetic criticism has been directed at Dawkins' earlier theory of memetics framed in The Selfish Gene. There have been some serious criticisms of memetics. Namely, there are a few key points on which most criticisms focus: mentalism, cultural determinism, Darwinian reduction, without academic novelty, and a lack of empirical evidence of memetic mechanisms.

Luis Benitez-Bribiesca points to the lack of memetic mechanisms. He refers to the lack of a code script for memes which would suggest a genuine analogy to DNA in genes. He also suggests he meme mutation mechanism is too unstable which would render the evolutionary process chaotic. That is to say that the "unit of information" which traverses across minds is perhaps too flexible in meaning to be a realistic unit. As such, he calls memetics "a pseudoscientific dogma" and "a dangerous idea that poses a threat to the serious study of consciousness and cultural evolution" among other things.

Another criticism points to memetic triviality. That is, some have argued memetics is derivative of more rich areas of study. One of these cases comes from Peircian semiotics, (e.g., Deacon, Kull) stating that the concept of meme is a lesser developed Sign. Meme is thus described in memetics as a sign without its triadic nature. Charles Sanders Peirce's semiotic theory involves a triadic structure: a sign (a reference to an object), an object (the thing being referred to), and an interpretant (the interpreting actor of a sign).  For Deacon and Kull, the meme is a degenerate sign, which includes only its ability of being copied. Accordingly, in the broadest sense, the objects of copying are memes, whereas the objects of translation and interpretation are signs.

Others have pointed to the fact that memetics reduces genuine social and communicative activity to genetic arguments, and this cannot adequately describe cultural participation of people. For example, Henry Jenkins, Joshua Green, and Sam Ford, in their book Spreadable Media (2013), criticize Dawkins' idea of the meme, writing that "while the idea of the meme is a compelling one, it may not adequately account for how content circulates through participatory culture." The three authors also criticize other interpretations of memetics, especially those which describe memes as "self-replicating", because they ignore the fact that "culture is a human product and replicates through human agency." In doing so, they align more closely with Shifman's notion of Internet Memetics and her addition of the human agency of stance to describe participatory structure.

Mary Midgley criticizes memetics for at least two reasons: 

Like other critics, Maria Kronfeldner has criticized memetics for being based on an allegedly inaccurate analogy with the gene; alternately, she claims it is "heuristically trivial", being a mere redescription of what is already known without offering any useful novelty.

New developments

Alternative definitions
Dawkins, in A Devil's Chaplain, expanded his definition of meme by saying there are actually two different types of memetic processes (controversial and informative). The first is a type of cultural idea, action, or expression, which does have high variance; for instance, a student of his who had inherited some of the mannerisms of Wittgenstein. The second type is a self-correcting meme that is highly resistant to mutation. As an example of this, he gives origami patterns taught to elementary students– the meme is either passed on in the exact sequence of instructions, or (in the case of a forgetful child) terminates. The self-correcting meme tends to not evolve, and to experience profound mutations in the rare event that it does.
Another definition, given by Hokky Situngkir, tried to offer a more rigorous formalism for the meme, memeplexes, and the deme, seeing the meme as a cultural unit in a cultural complex system. It is based on the Darwinian genetic algorithm with some modifications to account for the different patterns of evolution seen in genes and memes. In the method of memetics as the way to see culture as a complex adaptive system, he describes a way to see memetics as an alternative methodology of cultural evolution.
DiCarlo (2010) developed the definition of meme further to include the idea of 'memetic equilibrium', which describe a culturally compatible state with biological equilibrium. In "How Problem Solving and Neurotransmission in the Upper Paleolithic led to The Emergence and Maintenance of Memetic Equilibrium in Contemporary World Religions", DiCarlo argues that as human consciousness evolved and developed, so too did our ancestors' capacity to consider and attempt to solve environmental problems in more conceptually sophisticated ways. When a satisfactory solution is found, the feeling of environmental stability, or memetic equilibrium, is achieved. The relationship between a gradually emerging conscious awareness and sophisticated languages in which to formulate representations combined with the desire to maintain biological equilibrium, generated the necessity for equilibrium to fill in conceptual gaps in terms of understanding three very important aspects in the Upper Paleolithic: causality, morality, and mortality. The desire to explain phenomena in relation to maintaining survival and reproductive stasis, generated a normative stance in the minds of our ancestors—Survival/Reproductive Value (or S-R Value).
Limor Shifman (2014) defines Internet memes, memes in digitally mediated contexts, to be (a) a group of digital items sharing common characteristics of content, form, and/or stance, which (b) were created with awareness of each other, and (c) were circulated, imitated, and/or transformed via the Internet by many users. Further, she outlines content as "both ideas and ideologies", form as "the physical incarnation of the message", and stance as "the information memes convey about their own communication." Stance is about how actors (e.g. people) position themselves in relation to content and form of the media as well as those who might be addressed by the message.
Over a decade after Kull's and Deacon's semiotic critique, Sara Cannizzaro offered her own development to redeem memes as fully formed cybersemiotic signs which has had limited success among those adjacent to Internet Memetics. In particular, she translates many of the neo-Darwinian conceptualizations of evolution to biosemiotic evolutionary concepts. This approach was theoretically integrated with an empirical investigation of information in Alexander O. Smith and Jeff Hemsley's development. They suggested under the influence of Cannizzaro's work that memes are "an information transmission network of documents connected through their differences among similarities and is interpreted as a semiotic system".

Memetic analysis
The possibility of quantitative analysis of memes using neuroimaging tools and the suggestion that such studies have already been done was given by McNamara (2011).  This author proposes hyperscanning (concurrent scanning of two communicating individuals in two separate MRI machines) as a key tool in the future for investigating memetics.
Velikovsky (2013) proposed the "holon" as the structure of the meme, synthesizing the major theories on memes of Richard Dawkins, Mihaly Csikszentmihalyi, E. O. Wilson, Frederick Turner (poet) and Arthur Koestler.
Proponents of memetics as described in the Journal of Memetics (out of print since 2005) believe that 'memetics' has the potential to be an important and promising analysis of culture using the framework of evolutionary concepts.
Keith Henson in Memetics and the Modular-Mind (Analog Aug. 1987) makes the case that memetics needs to incorporate evolutionary psychology to understand the psychological traits of a meme's host.

Applications

Research methodologies that apply memetics go by many names: Viral marketing, cultural evolution, the history of ideas, social analytics, and more.  Many of these applications do not make reference to the literature on memes directly but are built upon the evolutionary lens of idea propagation that treats semantic units of culture as self-replicating and mutating patterns of information that are assumed to be relevant for scientific study.  For example, the field of public relations is filled with attempts to introduce new ideas and alter social discourse.  One means of doing this is to design a meme and deploy it through various media channels.  One historic example of applied memetics is the PR campaign conducted in 1991 as part of the build-up to the first Gulf War in the United States.

The application of memetics to a difficult complex social system problem, environmental sustainability, has recently been attempted at thwink.org Using meme types and memetic infection in several stock and flow simulation models, Jack Harich has demonstrated several interesting phenomena that are best, and perhaps only, explained by memes. One model, The Dueling Loops of the Political Powerplace, argues that the fundamental reason corruption is the norm in politics is due to an inherent structural advantage of one feedback loop pitted against another. Another model, The Memetic Evolution of Solutions to Difficult Problems, uses memes, the evolutionary algorithm, and the scientific method to show how complex solutions evolve over time and how that process can be improved. The insights gained from these models are being used to engineer memetic solution elements to the sustainability problem.

Another application of memetics in the sustainability space is the crowdfunded Climate Meme Project conducted by Joe Brewer and Balazs Laszlo Karafiath in the spring of 2013. This study was based on a collection of 1000 unique text-based expressions gathered from Twitter, Facebook, and structured interviews with climate activists. The major finding was that the global warming meme is not effective at spreading because it causes emotional duress in the minds of people who learn about it.  Five central tensions were revealed in the discourse about [climate change], each of which represents a resonance point through which dialogue can be engaged.  The tensions were Harmony/Disharmony (whether or not humans are part of the natural world), Survival/Extinction (envisioning the future as either apocalyptic collapse of civilization or total extinction of the human race), Cooperation/Conflict (regarding whether or not humanity can come together to solve global problems), Momentum/Hesitation (about whether or not we are making progress at the collective scale to address climate change), and Elitism/Heretic (a general sentiment that each side of the debate considers the experts of its opposition to be untrustworthy).

Ben Cullen, in his book Contagious Ideas, brought the idea of the meme into the discipline of archaeology. He coined the term "Cultural Virus Theory", and used it to try to anchor archaeological theory in a neo-Darwinian paradigm. Archaeological memetics could assist the application of the meme concept to material culture in particular.

Francis Heylighen of the Center Leo Apostel for Interdisciplinary Studies has postulated what he calls "memetic selection criteria". These criteria opened the way to a specialized field of applied memetics to find out if these selection criteria could stand the test of quantitative analyses. In 2003 Klaas Chielens carried out these tests in a Masters thesis project on the testability of the selection criteria.

In Selfish Sounds and Linguistic Evolution, Austrian linguist Nikolaus Ritt has attempted to operationalise memetic concepts and use them for the explanation of long term sound changes and change conspiracies in early English. It is argued that a generalised Darwinian framework for handling cultural change can provide explanations where established, speaker centred approaches fail to do so. The book makes comparatively concrete suggestions about the possible material structure of memes, and provides two empirically rich case studies.

Australian academic S.J. Whitty has argued that project management is a memeplex with the language and stories of its practitioners at its core. This radical approach sees a project and its management as an illusion; a human construct about a collection of feelings, expectations, and sensations, which are created, fashioned, and labeled by the human brain. Whitty's approach requires project managers to consider that the reasons for using project management are not consciously driven to maximize profit, and are encouraged to consider project management as naturally occurring, self-serving, evolving process which shapes organizations for its own purpose.

Swedish political scientist Mikael Sandberg argues against "Lamarckian" interpretations of institutional and technological evolution and studies creative innovation of information technologies in governmental and private organizations in Sweden in the 1990s from a memetic perspective. Comparing the effects of active ("Lamarckian") IT strategy versus user–producer interactivity (Darwinian co-evolution), evidence from Swedish organizations shows that co-evolutionary interactivity is almost four times as strong a factor behind IT creativity as the "Lamarckian" IT strategy.

Terminology
 Memeplex – (an abbreviation of meme-complex) is a collection or grouping of memes that have evolved into a mutually supportive or symbiotic relationship. Simply put, a meme-complex is a set of ideas that reinforce each other. Meme-complexes are roughly analogous to the symbiotic collection of individual genes that make up the genetic codes of biological organisms. An example of a memeplex would be a religion.
 Meme pool – a population of interbreeding memes.
 Memetic engineering – The process of deliberately creating memes, using engineering principles.
 Memetic algorithms – an approach to evolutionary computation that attempts to emulate cultural evolution in order to solve optimization problems.
 Memotype – is the actual information-content of a meme.
 Memeoid – a neologism for people who have been taken over by a meme to the extent that their own survival becomes inconsequential. Examples include kamikazes, suicide bombers and cult members who commit mass suicide. The term was apparently coined by H. Keith Henson in "Memes, L5 and the Religion of the Space Colonies," L5 News, September 1985 pp. 5–8, and referenced in the expanded second edition of Richard Dawkins' book The Selfish Gene (p. 330). But in the strict sense all people are essentially memeoid, since no distinction can be made if one uses language, or memes use their host. In The Electronic Revolution William S. Burroughs writes: "the word has not been recognised as a virus because it has achieved a state of stable symbiosis with the host."
 Memetic equilibrium – the cultural equivalent of species biological equilibrium. It is that which humans strive for in terms of personal value with respect to cultural artefacts and ideas. The term was coined by Christopher diCarlo.
 Metamemetic thinking - coined by Diego Fontanive, is the thinking skill & cognitive training capable of making individuals acknowledge illogical memes.
 Eumemics - the belief and practice of deliberately improving the quality of the meme pool.
 Memocide - intentional action to eradicate a meme or memeplex from the population, either by killing its carriers or by censorship.

See also

References

Sources

 Apter, Emily (2019). Alphabetic Memes: Caricature, Satire, and Political Literacy in the Age of Trump (PDF). OCTOBER Journal 170, Fall 2019, MIT Press Journal
Botz-Bornstein, Thorsten (2008). "Can Memes Play Games? Memetics and the Problem of Space" in T. Botz-Bornstein (ed.): Culture, Nature, Memes: Dynamic Cognitive Theories (Newcastle: Cambridge Scholars Press), pp. 142–156. 
Boyd, Robert & Richerson, Peter J. (1985). Culture and the Evolutionary Process. University of Chicago Press.  
 Boyd, Rob & Richerson, Peter J. (2005). Not by Genes Alone: How Culture Transformed Human Evolution. Chicago University Press. 
 
 DiCarlo, Christopher W. 2010. "How Problem Solving and Neurotransmission in the Upper Paleolithic led to The Emergence and Maintenance of Memetic Equilibrium in Contemporary World Religions." Politics and Culture. https://politicsandculture.org/2010/04/27/how-problem-solving-and-neurotransmission-in-the-upper-paleolithic-led-to-the-emergence-and-maintenance-of-memetic-equilibrium-in-contemporary-world-religions/
 
 Edmonds, Bruce. 2002. "Three challenges for the survival of memetics." Journal of Memetics - Evolutionary Models of Information Transmission, 6. http://cfpm.org/jom-emit/2002/vol6/edmonds_b_letter.html
 Edmonds, Bruce. 2005. "The revealed poverty of the gene-meme analogy – why memetics per se has failed." Journal of Memetics - Evolutionary Models of Information Transmission, 9. http://cfpm.org/jom-emit/2005/vol9/edmonds_b.html
 Heylighen F. & Chielens K. (2009): Evolution of Culture, Memetics, in: Encyclopedia of Complexity and Systems Science, ed. B. Meyers (Springer)
 Houben, Jan E.M. "Memetics of Vedic Ritual, Morphology of the Agnistoma." Powerpoint presentation first presented at the Third International Vedic Workshop, Leiden 2002 www.academia.edu/7090834
 Houben, Jan E.M. "A Tradição Sânscrita entre Memética Védica e Cultura Literária." (In Portuguese) Revista Linguagem & Ensino, vol. 17 n. 2 (2014), p. 441-469. www.rle.ucpel.tche.br/index.php/rle/article/view/1089/783
 The Selfish Gene by Richard Dawkins, Oxford University Press, 1976, 2nd edition, December 1989, hardcover, 352 pages, ; April 1992, ; trade paperback, September 1990, 352 pages, 
 Aunger, Robert. The Electric Meme: A New Theory of How We Think. New York: Free Press, 2002.  
 The Meme Machine by Susan Blackmore, Oxford University Press, 1999, hardcover , trade paperback , May 2000, 
 The Ideology of Cybernetic Totalist Intellectuals an essay by Jaron Lanier which is very strongly critical of "meme totalists" who assert memes over bodies.
 Culture as Complex Adaptive System by Hokky Situngkir – formal interplays between memetics and cultural analysis.
 Journal of Memetics – Evolutionary Models of Information Transmission
 Brodie, Richard. Virus of the Mind: The New Science of the Meme. Seattle, Wash: Integral Press, 1996.  
 Cultural Software: A Theory of Ideology by Jack Balkin which uses memetics to explain the growth and spread of ideology.
 Can we Measure Memes? by Adam McNamara which presents neuroimaging tools to measure memes.
 Convivere con la memetica (in Italian) by Francesco Somigli, 2011 Lulu.com

External links
 "What’s in a Meme?" – Richard Dawkins Foundation

 
1980s neologisms
Concepts in epistemology
Concepts in the philosophy of mind
Concepts in the philosophy of science
Genetics
Mental content

de:Mem